Glasha and Kikimora is a 1992 Russian Animation film by Alexander Mazaev. This cartoon was produced by Soyuzmultfilm studio. "Glasha and Kikimora" is The Fairy Tale cartoon.

Plot
The Plot of The Film based on The Original Fairy Tale including The Heroes of The Folk Tales.  It is The Magic Story how Glasha has rescued her younger little sister from The Malicious Kikimora.  Glasha's Adventures happen in the night forest. Glasha also helps her Black cat. When the sun rises, evil sorcery dissipated. Glasha decides, that it was her dream.

Creators

External links

Glasha and Kikimora at Animator.ru

1992 films
Russian animated films
1990s Russian-language films
Soyuzmultfilm